Chris or Christopher Hicks  may refer to:

Chris Hicks (rugby league) (born 1977), Australian professional rugby league footballer
Chris Hicks (record executive) (born 1970), American record industry executive
Christopher Hicks, a.k.a. Oly Hicks (born 1968), Canadian-Italian ice hockey coach
 Chris Hicks, 37th District Attorney in Washoe County since January 2015 and son of US District Judge Larry R. Hicks